Several high schools are called Woodbridge High School including:

Canada
Woodbridge College, Woodbridge, Ontario (1958-1991)

United Kingdom
Woodbridge High School, Woodford Green, Woodford Bridge, London

United States
Woodbridge High School (Irvine, California)
Woodbridge High School (Bridgeville, Delaware)
Woodbridge High School (New Jersey), Woodbridge, New Jersey
Woodbridge High School (Virginia), Woodbridge, Virginia